SN 1993J is a supernova observed in the galaxy M81. It was discovered on 28 March 1993 by F. Garcia in Spain. At the time, it was the second-brightest type II supernova observed in the twentieth century behind SN 1987A,
peaking at a visible apparent magnitude of 10.7 on March 30th, with a second peak of 10.86 on April 18th.

The spectral characteristics of the supernova changed over time. Initially, it looked more like a type II supernova (a supernova formed by the explosion of a giant star) with strong hydrogen spectral line emission, but later the hydrogen lines faded and strong helium spectral lines appeared, making the supernova look more like a type Ib. Moreover, the variations in SN 1993J's luminosity over time were not like the variations observed in other type II supernovae but did resemble the variations observed in type Ib supernovae. Hence, the supernova has been classified as a type IIb supernova, an intermediate class between type II and type Ib. The scientific results from this supernova suggested that type Ib and Ic supernovae were actually formed through the explosions of giant stars through processes similar to what takes place in type II supernovae. The supernova was also used to estimate a distance of 8.5 ± 1.3 Mly (2.6 ± 0.4 Mpc) to Messier 81.

Light echoes from the explosion have subsequently been detected.

The progenitor of SN 1993J was identified in pre-explosion ground-based images. The progenitor was observed to be a K-type supergiant star, with an excess in the ultraviolet possibly due to surrounding hot stars or a hot binary companion. While the supernova is located in a region populated by young massive stars, late-time photometry with the Hubble Space Telescope and spectroscopy with the Keck 10m-telescope presented by Maund and collaborators revealed the presence of the long-suspected B-supergiant companion star.

References

External links
 Video of artist's impression of the SN 1993J binary progenitor system
 Light curves and spectra  on the Open Supernova Catalog

Supernovae
19930328
Ursa Major (constellation)